Voskepar is a village in the Noyemberyan Municipality of the Tavush Province of Armenia, located close to the Armenia–Azerbaijan border.

Etymology 
Voskepar derives its name from the Voskepar mountain range; from Armenian Ոսկե (voske, gold), and պարան (paran: string or chain). In the 19th and 20th centuries the village was also known as Aksibara and Akhsibara.

History 

Voskepar was founded in the 6th century. The village contains the 7th-century Armenian Holy Mother of God Church.

First Nagorno-Karabakh War 
During the First Nagorno-Karabakh War, seven people were killed in inter-ethnic fighting in and around the village.

In 1991, the second operation of Operation Ring took place in and around Voskepar. This was a military operation conducted by Soviet Internal Security Forces and OMON units, officially dubbed a "passport checking operation," the stated goal launched by the Soviet Union's internal and defense ministries was to disarm Armenian militia detachments, which were organized in "[illegally] armed formations." The operation involved the use of soldiers who accompanied a complement of military vehicles, artillery and helicopter gunships to be used to root out the self-described Armenian fedayeen. However, contrary to their stated objectives, Soviet troops and the predominantly Azerbaijani soldiers in the Azerbaijan SSR OMON and army forcibly depopulated many Armenians. Some authors have also described the actions of the joint Soviet and Azerbaijani force as ethnic cleansing. According to Svante E. Cornell, Operation Ring was carried out with 'harshly systematic human rights violations'.

Five Azerbaijani soldiers were killed in the border area close to the village in May 2012.

Geography 
The abandoned villages of Yukhari Askipara (Upper Askipara, Verin Voskepar in Armenian) and Ashagi Askipara (Lower Askipara, Nerkin Voskepar in Armenian) are located near the village.

Demographics 
The population of the village was 956 in 2001, 880 in 2008, and 818 in 2011.

Economy and culture 
The population is mainly engaged in agriculture and animal husbandry. The village contains a health clinic, a house of culture, and a community center. There were 103 school pupils in the village in 2011. Besides the Holy Mother of God Church, the village also contains the St. Astvatsatsin Church and the St. Sarkin Church, built in 2000.

Gallery

References

External links 

 "Voskepar", Tavush Province website (in Armenian)
 Armenia Rural Development Program, development status of Voskepar

Populated places in Tavush Province